Debra Genovese (born March 9, 1955) is an American luger. In 1978, Genovese was the North American champion. She competed in the women's singles event at the 1980 Winter Olympics.

References

External links
 

1955 births
Living people
American female lugers
Olympic lugers of the United States
Lugers at the 1980 Winter Olympics
Sportspeople from Rockford, Illinois
21st-century American women